Bryotropha svenssoni is a moth of the family Gelechiidae. It is found in central China and eastern Asia, including Japan.

The wingspan is 12–13 mm.

References

Moths described in 1984
svenssoni
Moths of Asia